Alexandros Natsiopoulos (born 5 January 1991) is a Greek professional footballer who plays as an attacking midfielder for Football League club Kalamata.

Club career
Natsiopoulos was raised in Iraklis' academies. He debuted for Iraklis in the club's first and only season in the Football League 2 in a home win against Megas Alexandros Irakleia on 11 March 2012.

References

External links 
 profile at theplayersagent.com 
 Player profile in Iraklis' Official site

Living people
1991 births
Greek footballers
Greek expatriate footballers
Iraklis Thessaloniki F.C. players
Association football midfielders
Footballers from Thessaloniki